Selçuk Can (born 10 August 1995) is a Turkish Greco-Roman wrestler. He won one of the bronze medals in the 72 kg event at the 2020 European Wrestling Championships held in Rome, Italy.

In 2021, he won the silver medal in the 72 kg event at the Matteo Pellicone Ranking Series 2021 held in Rome, Italy.

In 2022, he won the gold medal in his event at the Vehbi Emre & Hamit Kaplan Tournament held in Istanbul, Turkey.

Major results

References

External links 
 

Living people
1995 births
Turkish male sport wrestlers
European Wrestling Championships medalists
21st-century Turkish people
World Wrestling Championships medalists